Grajales is a surname. Notable people with the surname include:

Antonio Maceo Grajales (1845–1896), Cuban lieutenant general
Crisanto Grajales (born 1987), Mexican triathlete
Fidel Kuri Grajales (born 1962), Mexican businessman and politician
Francisco Grajales Palacios (born 1956), Mexican politician
Julieta Grajales (born 1986), Mexican actress
Mariana Grajales Cuello (1808–1893), Cuban women's rights activist
Pedro Grajales (born 1940), Colombian sprinter
Rafael Lara Grajales (revolutionary), Mexican general

Spanish-language surnames